3x3 basketball has been a European Games sport since the inaugural edition.

Medal table

Men's tournament

Participating nations

Women's tournament

Participating nations

References
2015 European Games at FIBA 3x3 Play
2019 European Games at FIBA 3x3 Play

External links
FIBA 3x3 Play official website

 
European Games